The Adventures of Jane Arden is a 1939 American crime film directed by Terry O. Morse and written by Vincent Sherman, Lawrence Kimble, and Charles W. Curran. The film stars Rosella Towne, William Gargan, James Stephenson, Benny Rubin, Dennie Moore and Peggy Shannon. The film was released by Warner Bros. on March 18, 1939.

Plot
A girl is killed by a criminal gang. Reporter Arden refuses to write the story, since she does not believe the police have found the real culprit, and gets fired for it. Apparently, the firing is fake, and she goes undercover to catch the real killers with stolen jewelry supplied by the investigator.

Cast          
Rosella Towne as Jane Arden
William Gargan as Ed Towers
James Stephenson as Dr. George Vanders
Benny Rubin as Marvin Piermont
Dennie Moore as Teenie Moore
Peggy Shannon as Lola Martin
Edgar Edwards as William 'Bill' Clifton
Hobart Cavanaugh as Suspect 'Killer'
Pierre Watkin as Albert Thayer
Maris Wrixon as Martha Blanton 
John Ridgely as Reporter

References

External links 
 

1939 films
1930s English-language films
Warner Bros. films
American crime films
1939 crime films
Films directed by Terry O. Morse
American black-and-white films
1939 directorial debut films
1930s American films